Duncan Robert Heath (born 6 November 1981) is an English former first-class cricketer.

Heath was born at Grimsby and was educated at Sir John Nelthorpe School, before going up to Pembroke College, Cambridge to study German and Russian. While at Cambridge he made his debut in first-class cricket for Cambridge UCCE against Middlesex at Fenner's in 2002. He played two further first-class matches in 2002 for Cambridge UCCE, as well as playing a first-class match for Cambridge University against Oxford University at Oxford. He played three first-class matches for Cambridge UCCE in 2003, as well as one match for Cambridge University. His final first-class appearance came for Cambridge University in 2005. Playing a total of nine first-class matches while at Cambridge, Heath scored a total of 256 runs at an average of 17.06, with a high score of 75. He took 8 wickets with his right-arm medium pace bowling, with best figures of 3 for 28. He gained  blues in both cricket and football, with Heath playing as a goalkeeper for Cambridge University A.F.C.

Heath played minor counties cricket for Lincolnshire in 2001 and 2002, making five appearances in the Minor Counties Championship, as well as two appearances in the minor counties one-day tournament. His brother, John, also played first-class cricket.

Notes and references

External links

1981 births
Living people
Alumni of Pembroke College, Cambridge
Association football goalkeepers
Cambridge MCCU cricketers
Cambridge University A.F.C. players
Cambridge University cricketers
Cricketers from Grimsby
English cricketers
English footballers
Footballers from Grimsby
Lincolnshire cricketers